Retrofile is one of the first major stock photography agencies. It was founded in 1920 by H. Armstrong Roberts. In late 2005, Getty Images acquired the Retrofile brand name and trademark. Some of Armstrong's collection not acquired by Getty will be available at Classic Stock.

External links
 Retrofile (former Retrofile domain now re-directed to Getty Images)

Stock photography